In mathematics, derivators are a proposed frameworkpg 190-195  for homological algebra giving a foundation for both abelian and non-abelian homological algebra and various generalizations of it. They were introduced to address the deficiencies of derived categories (such as the non-functoriality of the cone construction) and provide at the same time a language for homotopical algebra.

Derivators were first introduced by Alexander Grothendieck in his long unpublished 1983 manuscript Pursuing Stacks. They were then further developed by him in the huge unpublished 1991 manuscript Les Dérivateurs of almost 2000 pages. Essentially the same concept was introduced (apparently independently) by Alex Heller.

The manuscript has been edited for on-line publication by Georges Maltsiniotis. The theory has been further developed by several other people, including Heller, Franke, Keller and Groth.

Motivations 
One of the motivating reasons for considering derivators is the lack of functoriality with the cone construction with triangulated categories. Derivators are able to solve this problem, and solve the inclusion of general homotopy colimits, by keeping track of all possible diagrams in a category with weak equivalences and their relations between each other. Derivators are able to encode this kind of information and provide a diagram calculus to use in derived categories and homotopy theory.

Definition

Prederivators 
Formally, a prederivator  is a 2-functorfrom a suitable 2-category of indices to the category of categories. Typically such 2-functors come from considering the categories  where  is called the category of coefficients. For example,  could be the category of small categories which are filtered, whose objects can be thought of as the indexing sets for a filtered colimit. Then, given a morphism of diagramsdenote  byThis is called the inverse image functor. In the motivating example, this is just precompositition, so given a functor  there is an associated functor . Note these 2-functors could be taken to bewhere  is a suitable class of weak equivalences in a category .

Indexing categories 
There are a number of examples of indexing categories which can be used in this construction

 The 2-category  of finite categories, so the objects are categories whose collection of objects are finite sets.
 The ordinal category  can be categorified into a two category, where the objects are categories with one object, and the functors come form the arrows in the ordinal category.
 Another option is to just use the category of small categories.
 In addition, associated to any topological space  is a category  which could be used as the indexing category.
 This can be generalized to any topos , so the indexing category is the underlying site.

Derivators 
Derivators are then the axiomatization of prederivators which come equipped with adjoint functors

Heuristically,  should correspond to inverse limits,  to colimits.

References

Bibliography

External links 
derivator in nLab
Subtopoi, open subtopos and closed subtopos
https://golem.ph.utexas.edu/category/2018/03/stabilization_of_derivators.html

Homotopical algebra
Homological algebra